KRCB, virtual channel 22 (VHF digital channel 5), is a Public Broadcasting Service (PBS) member television station licensed to Cotati, California, United States, and serving the San Francisco Bay Area. Owned by Northern California Public Media, it is a sister station to National Public Radio (NPR) members KRCG-FM (91.1) and KRCB-FM (104.9). The two stations share studios on Labath Avenue in Rohnert Park; the TV station's transmitter is located at Sutro Tower in San Francisco.

History
KRCB first went on the air in 1984. The station was founded by Nancy Dobbs, president and CEO of KRCB North Bay Public Media, along with other volunteers in the North Bay, including Dobbs' husband, John Kramer (a professor at Sonoma State University).

KRCB agreed to move frequencies, while retaining its display channel number, in the FCC auction for $72 million on February 10, 2017. The proceeds were used to start an endowment. On September 7, 2017, KRCB announced that it would acquire KCSM-TV in San Mateo from the San Mateo County Community College District for $12 million, using some of the money earned in the auction; the acquisition allows KRCB to expand its reach into the Bay Area, as KCSM-TV's transmitter is located at the Sutro Tower in San Francisco. KRCB relaunched KCSM-TV as KPJK on July 31, 2018; the station was named in honor of John Kramer, who had died in 2014. Concurrently with the launch of KPJK, the stations came under the Northern California Public Media banner.

Technical information

Subchannels 
The station's digital signal is multiplexed:

Analog-to-digital conversion
KRCB shut down its analog signal, over UHF channel 22, on June 12, 2009, as part of the federally mandated transition from analog to digital television. The station's digital signal relocated from its pre-transition UHF channel 23 to channel 22.

References

External links

Mass media in Sonoma County, California
Television channels and stations established in 1983
1983 establishments in California
RCB
Rohnert Park, California